The inch per second is a unit of speed or velocity. It expresses the distance  in inches (in) traveled or displaced, divided by time in seconds (s, or sec). The equivalent SI unit is the metre per second.

Abbreviations include in/s, in/sec, ips, and less frequently in s−1.

Conversions
1 inch per second is equivalent to:
 = 0.0254 metres per second (exactly)
 =  or 0.083 feet per second (exactly)
 =  or 0.05681 miles per hour (exactly)
 = 0.09144 km·h−1 (exactly)

1 metre per second ≈ 39.370079 inches per second (approximately)
1 foot per second = 12 inches per second (exactly)
1 mile per hour = 17.6 inches per second (exactly)
1 kilometre per hour ≈ 10.936133 inches per second (approximately)

Uses
In magnetic tape sound recording, magnetic tape speed is often quoted in inches per second (abbreviated "ips").

Also computer mice sensitivity is also often referred to in inches per second (abbreviated as "ips") along with g force.

In rotorcraft health monitoring, rotor and shaft induced vibration levels are often quoted in inches per second.

See also
 Orders of magnitude (speed)

References

Units of velocity